Beach Cruiser is the debut studio album by American rapper Glasses Malone. It was released on August 29, 2011, by Glasses Malone's record label Blu Division Music, Hoo-Bangin' Records, Young Money Entertainment, Cash Money Records and Universal Republic Records, distributed by Suburban Noize Records. The album's release has been postponed several times between its initial announcement and its eventual release.

Title 
The album's title is named, after the beach cruiser bicycle. In an interview Glasses Malone said, "It's called Beach Cruiser, everybody loves a Beach Cruiser. People love those bikes in the 'hood. It's classic, also when y'all gonna hear the music on the record it gonna be dope to a point where you just feel like there is some kind of cruise which you just ridin to the beach, so again I called it Beach Cruiser."

Singles 
The album's first single, "Certified" featuring Akon, was released on November 6, 2007. The song peaked at number 85 on the US Hot R&B/Hip-Hop Songs and peaked at number 24 on the US Hot Rap Tracks charts.

"Haterz" featuring Birdman and Lil Wayne, was released as the album's second single on August 19, 2008.

"Til da Sun Come Up" featuring T-Pain, Rick Ross and Birdman, was released as the album's third single on May 12, 2009. The song peaked at number 94 on the Hot R&B/Hip-Hop Songs Chart.

I Get Doe featuring The Cataracs, was released as the album's fourth single on June 15, 2010.

Commercial performance 
According to HipHopDX, the album has sold 3,200 copies during the first week, debuting at number 165 on the US Billboard 200.

Critical response 
HipHopDX gave the album a 3 out of 5 rating calling the album " more of a throwback than a new jack, more of a memory than the future, but he bangs." and concluded with "With unpolished rhymes, a gutter flow and street-centered approach, it’ll be interesting to see what he does when label woes don’t interfere with his path."

Track listing

References 

2011 debut albums
Glasses Malone albums
Cash Money Records albums
Universal Records albums
Albums produced by DJ Toomp
Albums produced by Terrace Martin
Albums produced by Tha Bizness
Albums produced by the Cataracs
Albums produced by Swizz Beatz
Albums produced by Mannie Fresh
Albums produced by Midi Mafia